Tadley Ewing Peake Dameron (February 21, 1917 – March 8, 1965) was an American jazz composer, arranger, and pianist.

Biography

Born in Cleveland, Ohio, Dameron was the most influential arranger of the bebop era, but also wrote charts for swing and hard bop players. The bands he arranged for included those of Count Basie, Artie Shaw, Jimmie Lunceford, Dizzy Gillespie, Billy Eckstine, and Sarah Vaughan. In 1940-41 he was the piano player and arranger for the Kansas City band Harlan Leonard and his Rockets.  He and lyricist Carl Sigman wrote "If You Could See Me Now" for Sarah Vaughan and it became one of her first signature songs. According to the composer, his greatest influences were George Gershwin and Duke Ellington.

In the late 1940s, Dameron wrote arrangements for Gillespie's big band, who gave the première of his large-scale orchestral piece Soulphony in Three Hearts at Carnegie Hall in 1948. Also in 1948, Dameron led his own group in New York, which included Fats Navarro; the following year Dameron was at the Paris Jazz Festival with Miles Davis. From 1961 he scored for recordings by Milt Jackson, Sonny Stitt, and Blue Mitchell.

Dameron also arranged and played for rhythm and blues musician Bull Moose Jackson. Playing for Jackson at that same time was Benny Golson, who was to become a jazz composer in his own right. Golson has said that Dameron was the most important influence on his writing.

Dameron composed several bop and swing standards, including "Hot House", "If You Could See Me Now", "Our Delight", "Good Bait" (composed for Count Basie) and "Lady Bird". Dameron's bands from the late 1940s and early 1950s featured leading players such as Fats Navarro, Miles Davis, Dexter Gordon, Sonny Rollins, Wardell Gray, and Clifford Brown.  In 1956 he led two sessions based on his compositions, released as the 1956 album "Fontainebleau" and the 1957 album "Mating Call". The latter featured John Coltrane.  Dameron developed an addiction to narcotics toward the end of his career. He was arrested on drug charges in 1957 and 1958, and served time (1959–60) in a federal prison hospital in Lexington, Kentucky. After his release, Dameron recorded a single notable project as a leader, The Magic Touch, but was sidelined by health problems; he had several heart attacks before dying of cancer in 1965, at the age of 48. He was buried at Ferncliff Cemetery in Hartsdale, New York.

Tributes
 In the 1980s drummer Philly Joe Jones and trumpeter Don Sickler founded Dameronia, a band which performed the music of Tadd Dameron.
 Saxophonist Dexter Gordon called him the "romanticist" of the bop movement.
 Music critic Scott Yanow called Dameron the "definitive arranger/composer of the bop era".
 Saxophonist Joe Lovano included five Dameron tunes on his 2000 album 52nd Street Themes.
 In 2006, trumpeter Peter Welker released Duke, Billy And Tadd as a tribute to Duke Ellington, Billy Strayhorn, and Dameron.
 Turkish drummer Ferit Odman released Dameronia with Strings, an album featuring eight Dameron tunes, in 2015.
 Trumpeter Joe Magnarelli's 2019 album If You Could See Me Now is a tribute to Dameron.
 In 2019, singer Vanessa Rubin released an album titled The Dream Is You: Vanessa Rubin Sings Tadd Dameron.

Discography

As leader/co-leader

As sideman
With John Coltrane
 John Coltrane Plays for Lovers (Prestige, 1966)
 Trane's Blues (Giants of Jazz, 1990)

With Miles Davis
 At Birdland (Durium, 1976)
 The Early Days Vol. 1 (Giants of Jazz, 1985)
 Birdland Days (Fresh Sound, 1990)

With Dexter Gordon
 New Trends of Jazz Volume 3 (Savoy, 1952)
 Long Tall Dexter (Savoy, 1976)
 Dexter Rides Again (Savoy, 1985)

With Fats Navarro
 Memorial Album (Blue Note, 1951)
 New Trends of Jazz Vol. 5 (Savoy, 1952)
 Fats-Bud-Klook-Sonny-Kinney (Savoy, 1955)
 Fats Navarro Memorial Theodore "Fats" Navarro 1923–1950 Volume I (London, 1956)
 The Fabulous Fats Navarro Volume 1 (Blue Note, 1957)
 The Fabulous Fats Navarro Volume 2 (Blue Note, 1957)
 Fats Navarro Featured with the Tadd Dameron Quintet (Jazzland, 1961)
 Fats Navarro Memorial Volume 1 (CBS, 1964)
 Prime Source (Blue Note, 1975)
 Fat Girl (Savoy, 1977)
 Featured with the Tadd Dameron Band (Milestone, 1977)
 At Royal Roost Volume 1 (Jazz View, 1991)
 Fats Blows 1946–1949 (Giants of Jazz, 1991)
 Royal Roost Sessions 1948 (Fresh Sound, 1991)

With Charlie Parker
 Bird Lives (Continental, 1962)
 Pensive Bird (Ember, 1969)
 Broadcast Performances Vol. 2 (ESP Disk, 1973)

References

Further reading
 Combs, Paul. (2012). Dameronia: The Life and Music of Tadd Dameron (Jazz Perspectives). University of Michigan Press. .

External links
 Tadd Dameron biographical information at the Dameron/Damron Family Association web page.
 Jazzbiographies.com.
Interview with Paul Combs, Author of DAMERONIA: THE LIFE AND MUSIC OF TADD DAMERON
 http://www.jazzhistorydatabase.com/content/musicians/combs_paul/interview.php

1917 births
1965 deaths
20th-century African-American musicians
20th-century American composers
20th-century American male musicians
20th-century American pianists
20th-century jazz composers
African-American jazz pianists
American jazz composers
American male jazz composers
American male pianists
American music arrangers
Blue Note Records artists
Burials at Ferncliff Cemetery
Columbia Records artists
Dameronia members
Deaths from cancer in New York (state)
Jazz arrangers
Jazz musicians from Ohio
Musicians from Cleveland
Prestige Records artists